The Maritime Silk Route Museum is the name of a museum on Hailing Island, Yangjiang, Guangdong Province, China. Work on the museum started in late 2004 and the museum opened to the public on 24December 2009.

The museum was built to hold 300,000 artifacts as well as having the facilities necessary to house pieces of shipwrecks in water tanks. The main exhibition is the Nanhai 1 shipwreck, a wooden vessel which sank just off Hailing Island at the end of the 10th century. The Nanhai 1 is housed in the Crystal Palace in a water tank, one of main features for the museum which is the only museum in Asia with these facilities for underwater display. The museum also has 200 artifacts on display from the wreck.

See also 
 Golden Banana
 Indo-Pacific
 International North–South Transport Corridor
 List of the largest trading partners of China
 Maritime Silk Road
 Suez Canal

References

External links

 Travel advertisement

Museums established in 2009
Museums in Guangdong
Maritime museums in China
Yangjiang